Henry Johnson (September 3, 1794February 27, 1868) was an American farmer, Republican politician, and Wisconsin pioneer.  He was instrumental in the founding of the Wisconsin State Agricultural Society, and served two terms in the Wisconsin State Assembly, representing eastern Kenosha County.  Earlier in his life, he was a member of the New York State Legislature.

Biography
Johnson was born in Williamstown, Vermont, in 1794 and moved to Niagara County, New York in 1810, where he became established and started a family.  By 1821 Johnson had become a prominent citizen in the newly formed Erie County, New York and was elected on the Whig Party ticket to the New York State Assembly for the 1839 session.  The family relocated to the Wisconsin Territory in 1844 and settled on a farm in the town of Pike (now the village of Somers in Kenosha County).  At the time, this was part of a larger Racine County, but Kenosha County was established as a separate entity by an act of the Wisconsin Legislature in January 1850. Later that same year he was elected on the Whig Party ticket  as one of the first two assemblymen for the newly formed Kenosha County and served, for the first of two sessions, on the Wisconsin State Assembly for the 1851 session.

Johnson became prominent in his new state through the farming community.  In January 1850, he brought together a number of Kenosha County farmers to create a "Farmer's Club of Kenosha County"—believed to be the first agricultural association in Wisconsin.  Five months later, on June 3, 1850, the club was formalized as the Kenosha County Agricultural Society with a constitution and bylaws.  Johnson was selected as the first president of the organization and later also served as corresponding secretary.  As President of the Kenosha County Agricultural Society, Johnson attended a meeting in the State Assembly hall in Madison, Wisconsin, on March 8, 1851, which recommended the formation of a State Agricultural Society.  Johnson took an active part in the meeting, and was appointed to a committee to draft a constitution for the State Agricultural Society.  On March 12, the convention met again and approved the constitution drafted by Johnson's committee.

Between the establishment of the Kenosha Agricultural Society in Spring 1850 and the State Agricultural Society in Spring 1851, Johnson was elected to the 1851 session of the Wisconsin State Assembly representing Kenosha County's eastern district—the towns of Pike (Somers), Pleasant Prairie, and Southport, as well as the city of Kenosha, which was incorporated in 1850.  Johnson remained a Whig until the creation of the Republican Party in 1854, and was subsequently elected to another term in the Assembly in 1855, running on the Republican ticket.

Personal life and family
Henry Johnson was the third child of seven children born to Henry Johnson and Betsey Johnson ( Vorce).  The elder Henry Johnson had served as a captain in the American Revolutionary War.  Johnson's younger brother Isaac L. Johnson, niece Martha Johnson(daughter of brother Lewis), nephew Leonard Johnson(son of brother Lewis), brother-in-law Almon Tinkham(husband of sister Betsey) and several of Betsey and sister Freelove's children all relocated to Kenosha County, Wisconsin.

The younger Henry Johnson married Violata Peckham of Niagara County, New York, sometime before 1820.  They had seven children:
 Lavina (born 1820) married English American immigrant Frederick J. Brande, who was also a prominent Kenosha County farmer and an ally of Henry Johnson in the founding of the Kenosha Agricultural Society and State Agricultural Society.  Brande held a number of local offices and owned an impressive farming estate, but committed suicide in 1889 after some financial problems.
 Horace M. (born 1821) became a farmer and butcher with his own estate in Sherburne County, Minnesota.  He also served in the 1st Minnesota Infantry Regiment and 1st Minnesota Cavalry Regiment during the American Civil War.
 Hiram (born 1823) quit farming and became a teacher, then went into business in Milwaukee.  He later moved to Madison, Wisconsin, where he worked as secretary of the Madison Manufacturing Company.
 Violata (born 1825)
 Charles H. (born 1829)
 Rebecca Maria (born 1832)
 Edwin (born 1835)

Henry Johnson died February 27, 1868.

References

External links
 

1794 births
1868 deaths
Farmers from Wisconsin
People from Somers, Wisconsin
People from Erie County, New York
People from Williamstown, Vermont
Wisconsin Republicans
Wisconsin Whigs
New York (state) Whigs
19th-century American politicians
Members of the Wisconsin State Assembly